Der langwierige Weg in die Wohnung der Natascha Ungeheuer (The Tedious Way to the Place of Natascha Ungeheuer) is a composition by the German composer Hans Werner Henze. It represents one of the most  examples of his early socialism-inspired works.

Overview 
Described as a "show for 17", it is a setting of a libretto based on the poetry collection by the Chilean poet Gaston Salvatore, who had been prominent in the West German student movement of 1968 in Berlin. It features a baritone soloist, whose demanding role includes sprechstimme, screeches and spoken passages. He is accompanied by an organist, jazz band and a chamber ensemble akin to that used in Schoenberg's Pierrot lunaire. Additionally, a large battery of percussion is used as well as voices and music on tape, representing street noises of Berlin, and brief extracts from Verdi's Aida and Mahler's Fifth Symphony.

The work is an allegory: Natascha Ungeheuer (in English 'monster', 'ogre', unlikely to refer to the German painter ) is the "siren of a false Utopia" according to Salvatore. She lures the leftist intellectual into the cosy situation whereby they preach socialist values whilst essentially living the same bourgeois middle class lifestyle, identifying with the proletariat in words only. In a broadly analogous way to the temptation of Christ, Salvatore's hero resists the temptation to go all the way to Natascha's apartment, yet "has not yet discovered his way to the revolution".

Recorded voices on tape were those of Dieter Schidor, Gaston Salvatore and Henze. The first performance in Germany was at the Deutsche Oper Berlin later that year.

It was met with boos from the audience, which, Henze reflected, "was understandable [in] that our portrait of Berlin caused displeasure" amongst the very intellectuals it savaged.

The work was recorded soon after for Deutsche Grammophon with the same forces.

Structure 
The work consists of the following segments and lasts about one hour:

References

Further reading 
 Flammer, Ernst Helmuth. "Form und Gehalt III: Eine Analyse von Hans Werner Henzes Der langwierige Weg in die Wohnung der Natascha Ungeheuer." Melos/NZM, no. 4 (1978), pp. 486–495
 Henze, Hans Werner. "Art and the Revolution". Music and Politics. Translated by Peter Labanyi. New York: Cornell University Press, 1982. 178–183.
 Henze, Hans Werner. "Natascha Ungeheuer". Music and Politics. Translated by Peter Labanyi. New York: Cornell University Press, 1982. 184–193.
 Jacobshagen, Arnold. "Musica impura. Hans Werner Henzes Der langwierige Weg in die Wohnung der Natascha Ungeheuer und die Studentenbewegung", in: Rebellische Musik. Gesellschaftlicher Protest und kultureller Wandel um 1968 (musicolonia, vol. 1), Arnold Jacobshagen and Markus Leniger (eds.), Cologne (Christoph Dohr) 2007, pp. 109–124

External links 
 

Operas
Chamber operas
German-language operas
Operas by Hans Werner Henze
1971 operas
Operas based on literature